Hypericum monanthemum is a species of flowering plant of the St. John's wort family (Hypericaceae) which is native to the Himalayan mountains.

Description 
Hypericum monanthemum is a perennial herb that varies in height from 0.1 to 0.4 meters (0.33 to 1.3 feet) tall. It can be found growing entirely upright, along the ground and upright towards the ends of the stems, or entirely along the ground. The base at the center of the stems is rooting and branching, and the stems are scattered across it, clustered in groups, or carpeting the whole base. It is often a very slender plant, and is usually unbranched in its upper parts, though it can rarely have a single pair of branches just below the inflorescence which are pointed upwards.

Taxonomy 
The species' placement within Hypericum can be summarized as follows:

Hypericum

 Hypericum subg. Hypericum
 Hypericum sect. Monanthema
 Hypericum daliense
 Hypericum himalaicum
 Hypericum ludlowii
 Hypericum subcordatum
 Hypericum trigonum
 Hypericum wightianum
 Hypericum monanthemum

Uses 
Despite being considered rare, Hypericum montanum has been recorded as being used in folk medicine in parts of India near the Himalayas, where it is referred to as Tenikmolitong. The whole plant is washed and crushed, and the resulting liquid is strained through fine cloth. The final product is then used as a kind of eye drop to treat irritated or diseased eyes.

References 

monanthemum